The First Church of Christ, Congregational is a historic church at 75 Main Street in Farmington, Connecticut.  Built in 1771, this Greek Revival church was designated a National Historic Landmark in 1975 for its role in sheltering the Amistad Africans before their return to Africa.

Description and history
The First Church of Christ in Farmington was founded in 1652. Roger Newton, the first pastor, was the son-in-law of Hartford founder Thomas Hooker, and was succeeded by Hooker's son, Samuel. Among First Church's pastors was Noah Porter, who began America's first foreign missionary society in the parlor of his home. He was also the father of Sarah Porter, founder of Miss Porter's School, and Noah Porter, Jr., president of Yale University.

The present church, the third, originally known as the Meeting House, was built in 1771, designed by Judah Woodruff.  The slender steeple on top of the bell tower can be seen for miles. The church is cited as an "excellent example of its architectural style and period".

The church began the first "Sabbath School" in the 1700s for the local Tunxis Indians, to teach them Christianity. It was a hub of the Underground Railroad, and became involved in the celebrated case of the African slaves who revolted on the Spanish vessel La Amistad. When the Africans who had participated in the revolt were released in 1841, they came to Farmington, and stayed with Austin Williams before their return to Africa. While staying in Farmington, they attended this church.  The Amistad case was important for the abolitionist cause and significant in the history of slavery in the United States.

The church was declared a National Historic Landmark in 1975. It is included in the Farmington Historic District.

First Church is affiliated with the United Church of Christ.

See also
 List of National Historic Landmarks in Connecticut
 National Register of Historic Places listings in Hartford County, Connecticut
 List of Underground Railroad sites

References

External links

First Church of Christ, Congregational, 1652 website
First Church Historical Notes
First Church of Christ listing on the National Register
First Church of Christ images
Amistad: Seeking Freedom in Connecticut, a National Park Service Discover Our Shared Heritage Travel Itinerary

African-American history of Connecticut
Farmington, Connecticut
National Historic Landmarks in Connecticut
United Church of Christ churches in Connecticut
Churches on the National Register of Historic Places in Connecticut
Churches in Hartford County, Connecticut
National Register of Historic Places in Hartford County, Connecticut
Individually listed contributing properties to historic districts on the National Register in Connecticut